The Mavilan are a Scheduled Tribe of Kerala, India. They inhabit the hill country of the Kannur and Kasaragod districts, where they were traditionally hunter-gatherers and practised shifting cultivation. In recent times, their way of life has been affected by regulation of forest areas and by incursion of non-tribal communities.

They speak Tulu as their primary language and also have knowledge of Malayalam.

The Mangalam Kali is a traditional dance performed by the tribe, as is the Theyyam.  

Mangalamkali is a dance custom followed by the Mavilans. This work of art is firmly identified with the way of life of the ancestral networks who have joined Dravidian culture into their life. Both men and women take an interest in this dance custom which is performed at specific favorable events like relationships. The entertainers dance musically to the beat of a customary percussion instrument called Thudi and the going with people tunes.

The word Mavilan originates from  'Mavilavu' a herb which Mavilans traditionally use in herb medicines. Mavilans were also known as MERA(R)s, in Tulu.

References 

Scheduled Tribes of Kerala
Hunter-gatherers of Asia